Countess Doddy (German: Komtesse Doddy) is a 1919 German silent comedy film directed by Georg Jacoby and starring Pola Negri, Harry Liedtke and Victor Janson.

The film's sets were designed by the art director Kurt Richter.

Cast
In alphabetical order
Georg Baselt
Poldi Deutsch
Victor Janson
Heddy Jendry
Max Kronert
Harry Liedtke
Paul Morgan
Pola Negri
Hans Adalbert Schlettow
Lissy Schwarz
Hermann Thimig
Emmy Wyda

References

External links

1919 comedy films
German comedy films
Films of the Weimar Republic
German silent feature films
Films directed by Georg Jacoby
German black-and-white films
UFA GmbH films
Silent comedy films
1910s German films